Bulinus hexaploidus is a species of freshwater snail, a gastropod in the Planorbidae family. It is endemic to Ethiopia.

References

Bulinus
Endemic fauna of Ethiopia
Gastropods described in 1972
Taxonomy articles created by Polbot